Mid-America Reformed Seminary is a graduate-level theological institution located in Dyer, Indiana, offering a biblical and theological education in the classic Reformed (Calvinistic) tradition. The seminary offers a three-year Master of Divinity degree program for students seeking ordination. A two-year Master of Theological Studies degree is offered for students who desire a theological education without seeking the ordained ministry.

The school is accredited by TRACS and ATS.

Relationship to the Church 
The school is not governed by any particular denomination, thereby allowing it to serve a variety of churches with ministerial training. Throughout its history Mid-America has prepared students for ordained ministry in the following confessionally Reformed and Presbyterian churches:

Christian Reformed Church in North America (CRCNA)
Orthodox Presbyterian Church (OPC)
Presbyterian Church in America (PCA)
Reformed Church in the United States (RCUS)
United Reformed Churches in North America (URCNA)

Mid-America's commitment to theological education is based on confessional allegiance rather than denominational affiliation.  Most faculty and board members were formerly associated with the Christian Reformed Church but are now affiliated with the United Reformed Churches. Additionally, about a third of the faculty are associated with the Orthodox Presbyterian Church. All members of the faculty and of the Board of Trustees are committed to the Holy Scriptures as the infallible and inerrant Word of God, and in conformity with the Word are committed to the ecumenical creeds of Christendom (the Apostles' Creed, Athanasian Creed, and Nicene Creed) and the Reformed Confessions (the Belgic Confession, the Heidelberg Catechism, the Canons of Dort, and the Westminster Confession of Faith) as faithfully setting forth the system of truth taught in Scripture.

History 

The seminary was founded on April 21, 1981, when a group of Christian Reformed ministers and laymen met at the Hilton Hotel at O'Hare International Airport in Chicago. At this meeting, it was decided to establish a seminary society and board of trustees, to purchase the Harmony Youth Home in Orange City, Iowa, to serve as the seminary's campus, and to name the seminary Mid-America Reformed Seminary. The seminary was intended as an alternative to Calvin Theological Seminary, the denominational seminary of the Christian Reformed Church in North America, which the founders of Mid-America believed was straying from its confessional Reformed identity.

In 1995 the seminary moved its campus to Dyer, Indiana, where it currently resides.

On April 8, 2006, Mid-America held a celebration of its 25th anniversary in the West Commons at Dordt College, and held other 25th anniversary celebrations throughout the United States and Canada in 2006.

The school boasts faculty members Cornel Venema, J Mark Beach, Alan Strange, Marcus Mininger, Andrew Compton, Mark Vander Hart, and Paul Ipema.

Publications 
Mid-America Journal of Theology - published annually with scholarly articles and book reviews
The Messenger - a quarterly newsletter
Called to Preach - a booklet by Dr. John Sittema written to those considering the gospel ministry

Notes 
 Mid-America E-Notes 24 April 2006.

 Ibid.

External links
Mid-America Reformed Seminary
"Mid-America Reformed Seminary 20 years old" Christian Renewal December 16, 2002

Presbyterianism in Indiana
Seminaries and theological colleges in Indiana
Transnational Association of Christian Colleges and Schools
Reformed church seminaries and theological colleges in the United States
Educational institutions established in 1981
1981 establishments in Indiana